Khoro is a clan of Ahirs of Haryana in India. Rewari was once under Khoro Ahir rulers. Dr. Hameeda Khoro is a famous politician of Sindh.

See also
 Ahir clans

References

Ahir